Sack of Aleppo may refer to:
 Sack of Aleppo (962)
 Sack of Aleppo (1400)